Enrique Margall (28 August 1944 – 24 October 1986) was a Spanish basketball player. He competed in the men's tournament at the 1968 Summer Olympics and the 1972 Summer Olympics.

References

1944 births
1986 deaths
Spanish men's basketball players
Olympic basketball players of Spain
Basketball players at the 1968 Summer Olympics
Basketball players at the 1972 Summer Olympics
Basketball players from Barcelona